Kheora is a village in the east-central part of Bangladesh. It is located at Mehari Union under Kasba Upazila in Brahmanbaria district of Chittagong division. Administratively, the village is divided into Ward No. 7 and 8 of Mehari Union. The village is known as the birthplace of Hindu spiritual saint Anandamayi Ma.

Demography 
According to the 2011 census, the total population of Kheora village is about 3697.

Location 
It is bounded on the west by Purquil village, on the south-west by Bahar Aata, on the south by Bamutia and Bugir villages, on the east by Sonargaon and Deli villages and on the north-east by Pataisar village. Purquil, Bahar Aata and Bamutia are under the same union, while Bugir, Sonargaon, Deli and Pataisar are under Kharera Union.

Notable people 
 Abdur Rahim [bn]— Freedom fighter (Bir Bikrom) of Bangladesh Liberation War.
 Anandamayi Ma — Hindu spiritual saint.

Education 
There is an MPO-affiliated high school and two government primary schools in this village:
 Kheora Anandamayi High School
 Kheora Government Primary School
 Kheora East Government Primary School

Important places 
 Sri Sri Ma Anandamayi Ashram
 Kalibari temple.

See also 
 Purquil
 Anandamayi Ma
 Mehari Union
 Kasba Upazila

References  

Villages in Bangladesh
Brahmanbaria District
Kasba Upazila
Villages in Brahmanbaria District